George Luther Hicks (April 4, 1871 – September 3, 1956) was a college football player and colonel in the U. S. Army. He served in the Spanish American War and World War I.

Biography
George Luther Hicks was a son of former Confederate field surgeon George L. Hicks, Sr. and Nancy Hicks, the daughter of Governor Thomas Holliday Hicks. He married Mabel Mullen.

University of Virginia
Hicks was a prominent tackle for the Virginia Cavaliers football team of the University of Virginia. The school claims a Southern championship every year he played. He was selected for an All-Southern team in 1895.

References

American football tackles
Virginia Cavaliers football players
19th-century players of American football
All-Southern college football players
1871 births
1956 deaths
People from Dorchester County, Maryland